An election to the Carmarthen Rural District Council in Wales was held in April 1913. It was preceded by the 1910 election and, due to the scheduled 1916 election being postponed due to the First World War, was followed by the 1919 election. The majority of members were returned unopposed. The successful candidates were also elected to the Carmarthen Board of Guardians.

Ward Results

Abergwili (two seats)

Abernant (one seat)

Conwil (two seats)

Laugharne Parish (one seat)

Laugharne Township (one seat)

Llanarthney (two seats)
The two sitting members stood down and former William Brazell was returned in second place,

Llandawke and Llansadurnen (one seat)

Llanddarog (one seat)

Llandeilo Abercowyn and Llangynog (one seat)

Llanddowror (one seat)

Llandyfaelog (one seat)

Llanfihangel Abercowin (one seat)

Llangain (one seat)

Llangendeirne (two seats)

Llangunnor (one seat)

Llangynin (one seat)

Llanllawddog (one seat)

Llanpumsaint (one seat)

Llanstephan (one seat)

Llanwinio (one seat)

Merthyr (one seat)

Mydrim (one seat)

Newchurch (one seat)

St Clears (one seat)

St Ishmaels (one seat)

Trelech a'r Betws (two seats)

Carmarthen Board of Guardians

All members of the District Council also served as members of Carmarthen Board of Guardians. In addition six members were elected to represent the borough of Carmarthen. All six sitting members were returned unopposed.

Carmarthen (six seats)

References

1913 Welsh local elections
Elections in Carmarthenshire
20th century in Carmarthenshire